Sedbergh (  or  ) is a town and civil parish in Cumbria, England. The 2001 census gave the parish a population of 2,705, increasing at the 2011 census to 2,765.

Situation

Sedbergh has a narrow main street lined with shops. From all angles, the hills rising behind the houses can be seen. Until the coming of the Ingleton Branch Line in 1861, these remote places were reachable only by walking over some steep hills. The line to Sedbergh railway station ran from 1861 to 1954.

The civil parish covers a large area, including the hamlets of Millthrop, Catholes, Marthwaite, Brigflatts, High Oaks, Howgill, Lowgill and Cautley, the southern part of the Howgill Fells and the western part of Baugh Fell.

George Fox, a founder of the Religious Society of Friends (Quakers), spoke in the churchyard of St Andrew's Church (which Quakers of the day called a "steeple house") and on nearby Firbank Fell during his travels in the North of England in 1652. Briggflatts Meeting House was built in 1675. It is the namesake of Basil Bunting's long poem Briggflatts (1966). Sedbergh School is a co-educational boarding school in the town; Settlebeck School is its main state-funded secondary school.

History
Sedbergh's parish church, dedicated to St Andrew the Apostle, dates from the 12th century, although restored periodically since. There is at least one house in the village dating from the 14th century. The remains of the motte and bailey castle are believed to date from Saxon times.

Sedbergh's longstanding industries were farming and production of woollen garments. Wool was taken to mills for spinning into yarn, from which people in their homes knitted clothing such as hats and socks. These were sold, for instance, to coalminers of North-East England. This trade of long ago is remembered at Farfield Mill, just outside the town, which has an exhibition of weaving equipment and workshops for a number of artists and crafts workers.

Historically, Sedbergh was part of the Ewecross wapentake in the West Riding of Yorkshire. From 1894 to 1974 it was part of Sedbergh Rural District. In 1974 it became part of the new county of Cumbria.

Governance
Sedbergh belongs to the Westmorland and Lonsdale parliamentary constituency, of which Tim Farron is the current Liberal Democrats member. Before Brexit, it was in the North West England European Parliamentary Constituency.

Sedbergh lies in the Kirkby Lonsdale ward of South Lakeland District, covering towns and surroundings with 6,369 inhabitants at the 2011 Census. It belongs to the Sedbergh + Kirkby Lonsdale Division of Cumbria County Council.

Sedbergh has a parish council.

Economy and amenities
Personal incomes come from a range of sources: the schools are major employers. Sedbergh is also England's official book town (like Hay-on-Wye in Wales and Wigtown in Scotland). Though smaller than these, it has several independent bookshops and dealers. Employment in small to medium manufacturing and wholesale companies may match or exceed that of schools – a growing feature of the economy. Other major sources are farming, retail and tourism. The profile of Sedbergh improved after it featured in a BBC documentary series, The Town that Wants a Twin, airing for twelve episodes in January and February 2005. One result was for Sedbergh to twin with Zreče in north-eastern Slovenia.

The town suffered an outbreak of foot-and-mouth disease in 2001. As livestock farming declined, it was promoted as a destination for walkers and ramblers. In 2015 the town was accepted as a Walkers are Welcome town.

The town golf club is located at Catholes-Abbott Holme.

A monthly booklet "Sedbergh and District Lookaround" gives details of local events and activities, including bus times and religious services.

Landmarks
Ingmire Hall, about two miles west of the town, contains the remains of a 16th-century house, including a pele tower, altered and enlarged in the 19th century by the Kendal architect George Webster, and again in the 20th century. It was damaged by fire in the 1920s, but extended and partly remodelled in 1989. It is built of coursed rubble with quoins and slate roofs. Although the hall is in private grounds, there is a public footpath along the driveway.

St Gregory's Church is a redundant Anglican church on the A684 road about 1.5 miles/ 2 km west of Sedbergh. It is designated a Grade II listed building recorded in the National Heritage List for England, maintained by Historic England and under the care of the Churches Conservation Trust.

The Cross Keys Inn is a 400-year-old pub now run by the National Trust.

Twin towns
 Zreče, Slovenia (since 2005)

Location grid

See also

Listed buildings in Sedbergh
Sedbergh School
Slingsby T.21, glider known in RAF service as the Sedbergh

References

External links

Sedbergh website
Sedbergh Gateway website – Information for Walkers and Cyclists
Cumbria County History Trust: Sedbergh (nb: provisional research only – see Talk page)
An illustrated guide to Sedbergh
Sedbergh Book Town
Sedbergh pictures and information
Farfield Mill and water turbine - video footage

 
Towns in Cumbria
History of Yorkshire
Civil parishes in Cumbria